The 1981–82 Major Indoor Soccer League season was the fourth in league history and would end with the New York Arrows  repeating once again as MISL champions.

Recap
It was a year of expansion, as the New Jersey Rockets were added and the schedule was lengthened by almost two months. The 44-game regular-season schedule was an increase of four games, and the playoff schedule was expanded to two best-of-three rounds and one best-of-five championship series. This was done to, as a league spokesman put it, force players to decide on either the indoor or outdoor game 

With the Hartford Hellions moving to Memphis and the San Francisco Fog moving to Kansas City, the league went back to a two-division setup. The top four finishers in each division would advance to the MISL playoffs.  The Pittsburgh Spirit returned, and had the second-best record in the league.

While the Arrows had the best record in the league and Steve Zungul won the scoring title again, New York was pushed hard in the playoffs. In their first round matchup with the Buffalo Stallions, the Stallions won the first game of the series in New York and held a 4-2 lead with 1:20 remaining in Game 2. Zungul and Omar Gomez scored 36 seconds apart to tie the match, and Dragan Simic scored in overtime to even the series. New York won Game 3 to advance.

New York and St. Louis would eventually meet in a five-game championship series that would see every game decided by two goals or less, including two in overtime.

After the season, the Philadelphia Fever would fold  and the New Jersey Rockets and Denver Avalanche suspended operations.

Teams

Regular season schedule

The 1981–82 regular season schedule ran from November 13, 1981, to April 25, 1982. The 44 games per team was an increase of four over the 1980–81 schedule of 40 games.

Final standings

Playoff teams in bold.

Playoffs

Quarterfinals

Semifinals

Championship Series

Regular season player statistics

Scoring leaders

GP = Games Played, G = Goals, A = Assists, Pts = Points

Leading goalkeepers

Note: GP = Games played; Min = Minutes played; GA = Goals against; GAA = Goals against average; W = Wins; L = Losses

Playoff player statistics

Scoring leaders

GP = Games Played, G = Goals, A = Assists, Pts = Points

Leading goalkeepers

Note: GP = Games played; Min = Minutes played; GA = Goals against; GAA = Goals against average; W = Wins; L = Losses

All-MISL teams

League awards
 Most Valuable Player: Steve Zungul, New York/Stan Terlecki, Pittsburgh
 Scoring Champion: Steve Zungul, New York
 Pass Master: Steve Zungul, New York
 Rookie of the Year: Germain Iglesias, Buffalo
 Defender of the Year: Val Tuksa, New York
 Goalkeeper of the Year: Slobo Ilijevski, St. Louis
 Coach of the Year: Dave Clements, Denver
 Championship Series Most Valuable Player: Steve Zungul, New York

References

External links
 The Year in American Soccer – 1982
 1981-82 summary at The MISL: A Look Back

Major Indoor Soccer League (1978–1992) seasons
Major
Major